Phil Pietroniro (born 27 May 1994) is a Canadian-born Italian ice hockey player who currently playing for HK Dukla Trenčín of the Slovak Extraliga. 

He represented Italy at the 2021 IIHF World Championship.

References

External links

1994 births
Living people
Asiago Hockey 1935 players
Canadian expatriate ice hockey players in the United States
Gatineau Olympiques players
Italian ice hockey defencemen
Shawinigan Cataractes players
Ice hockey people from Montreal
Utah Grizzlies (ECHL) players
Val-d'Or Foreurs players
Victoriaville Tigres players
HK Dukla Trenčín players
Canadian sportspeople of Italian descent
Naturalised citizens of Italy
Italian expatriate ice hockey people
Italian expatriate sportspeople in the United States
Italian expatriate sportspeople in Slovakia
Italian expatriate sportspeople in France
Canadian expatriate ice hockey players in France
Canadian expatriate ice hockey players in Slovakia